Pápai Perutz Futball Club is a professional football club based in Pápa, Hungary, that competes in the Nemzeti Bajnokság III, the third tier of Hungarian football.

History
Pápai FC qualified for the 2017–18 Nemzeti Bajnokság III season on slots.

Honours

Domestic
Veszprém megyei bajnokság:
Winner (1): 2016–17

External links
 Profile on Magyar Futball

References

Football clubs in Hungary
Association football clubs established in 2015
2015 establishments in Hungary